TaiMall is a shopping mall in Luzhu District, Taoyuan, Taiwan that opened on July 4, 1999. It is the first American-style shopping mall in Taiwan.

History
 In August 1994, TaiMall Development Co., Ltd. cooperated with the land policy of the industrial and commercial complex promoted by the government and filed an application for the development of the Nankan industrial and commercial complex into a shopping center. It took three years to obtain the development permit and complete the land change. With a two-year construction period with a total expenditure of NT$7.4 billion, the TaiMall Nankan Family Entertainment Shopping Center officially opened on July 4, 1999.
 In October 2008, GIC (Singaporean sovereign wealth fund), the original shareholder of TaiMall Development, established a Singapore-based company New TaiMall Global Co., Ltd. in Taiwan. The operation management and planning of the shopping center is managed by the TaiMall Shopping Center Management Consulting Co., Ltd. under the Singaporean multinational company "Keppel Corporation".
 On December 18, 2010, after a two-year and two-stage major renovation, it was refurbished and opened with "New TaiMall Getting Better".
 From July to October 2014, with the theme of TaiMall's "Belle Era: A New Departure", it spent NT$300 million on refitting, and the refurbishment opened in December.
 In 2015, the performance reached a record high, becoming the number one department store in Taoyuan City.
The re-planned stylish commercial space is spacious and comfortable, presenting a simple Loft fashion light industrial style. The original sports venue is  integrated with the outdoor green space plan, and it is converted to an open recreational space that combines multiple functions such as sports, entertainment, and leisure.
 In 2017, the annual performance was NT$6 billion, ranking No. 1 in Taoyuan City Department Store for three consecutive years; it won the fourth place in the category of service industry-department shopping center in CommonWealth Magazine in 2017.

Facilities
The main shopping center has 7 storeys above ground and 3 storeys below ground, with a total of 48 escalators and 6 large elevators that can accommodate 24 people.

There are multiple performance venues indoors and outdoors in the TaiMall Shopping Center. The Smile Theater on the second basement floor is equipped with a fixed stage, lighting, sound, and backstage. It is suitable for presentations and concerts. The area can create a visual effect extending from the second underground floor to the seventh floor.

In the summer of 2020, the brand-new landmark TaiMall❤Park opened. There is a "children's play area" that parents and families love, a basketball court and an inline roller coaster court. Outdoor green spaces also host various markets, concerts, picnics, large Christmas parties, etc., providing rich and diverse leisure life proposals.

Gallery

See also
 List of tourist attractions in Taiwan
 Gloria Outlets
 MetroWalk Shopping Center

References

External links

 TaiMall Official Website

1999 establishments in Taiwan
Shopping malls in Taoyuan
Shopping malls established in 1999